Antiochus X Eusebes Philopator ( – 92 or 88 BC) was a Seleucid monarch who reigned as King of Syria during the Hellenistic period between 95 BC and 92 BC or 89/88 BC (224 SE [Seleucid year]). He was the son of Antiochus IX and perhaps his Egyptian wife Cleopatra IV. Eusebes lived during a period of general disintegration in Seleucid Syria, characterized by civil wars, foreign interference by Ptolemaic Egypt and incursions by the Parthians. Antiochus IX was killed in 95BC at the hands of Seleucus VI, the son of his half-brother and rival Antiochus VIII. Antiochus X then went to the city of Aradus where he declared himself king. He avenged his father by defeating Seleucus VI, who was eventually killed.

Antiochus X did not enjoy a stable reign as he had to face three of Seleucus VI's brothers, Antiochus XI, Philip I and Demetrius III. Antiochus XI defeated AntiochusX and expelled him from the capital Antioch in 93 BC. A few months later, AntiochusX regained his position and killed Antiochus XI. This led to both Philip I and Demetrius III becoming involved. The civil war continued but its final outcome is uncertain due to the contradictions between different ancient historians' accounts. AntiochusX married his stepmother, Antiochus IX's widow Cleopatra Selene, and had several children with her, including a future king Antiochus XIII.

The death of Antiochus X is a mystery. The year of his demise is traditionally given by modern scholars as 92 BC, but other dates are also possible including the year 224 SE (89/88BC). The most reliable account of his end is that of the first century historian Josephus, who wrote that AntiochusX marched east to fight off the Parthians who were attacking a queen called Laodice; the identity of this queen and who her people were continues to be debated. Other accounts exist: the ancient Greek historian Appian has AntiochusX defeated by the Armenian king Tigranes II and losing his kingdom; the third century historian Eusebius wrote that AntiochusX was defeated by his cousins and escaped to the Parthians before asking the Romans for help in having him reinstated on the throne. Modern scholars prefer the account of Josephus and question practically every aspect of the versions presented by other ancient historians. Numismatic evidence shows that AntiochusX was succeeded in Antioch by Demetrius III, who controlled the capital in  SE (88/87 BC).

Background, early life and name 

The second century BC witnessed the disintegration of the Syria-based Seleucid Empire due to never-ending dynastic feuds and foreign Egyptian and Roman interference. Amid constant civil wars, Syria fell to pieces. Seleucid pretenders fought for the throne, tearing the country apart. In 113 BC, Antiochus IX declared himself king in opposition to his half-brother Antiochus VIII. The siblings fought relentlessly for a decade and a half until Antiochus VIII was killed in 96 BC. The following year, Antiochus VIII's son Seleucus VI marched against Antiochus IX and killed him near the Syrian capital Antioch.

Egypt and Syria attempted dynastic marriages to maintain a degree of peace. Antiochus IX married several times; known wives are his cousin Cleopatra IV of Egypt, whom he married in 114 BC, and her sister Cleopatra Selene, the widow of Antiochus VIII. None of those assertions are based on evidence, and the mother of AntiochusX is not named in ancient sources. Antiochus is a Greek name meaning "resolute in contention". The capital Antioch received its name in deference to Antiochus, the father of the Seleucid dynasty's founder Seleucus I; the name became dynastic and many Seleucid kings bore it.

Reign 

According to Josephus, following the death of his father, AntiochusX went to the city of Aradus where he declared himself king; it is possible that Antiochus IX, before facing Seleucus VI, sent his son to that city for protection. Aradus was an independent city since 137 BC, meaning that AntiochusX made an alliance with it, since he would not have been able to subdue it by force at that stage of his reign. As the descendants of Antiochus VIII and Antiochus IX fought over Syria, they portrayed themselves in the likeness of their respective fathers to indicate their legitimacy; Antiochus X's busts on his coins show him with a short nose that ends with an up-turn, like his father. Ancient Hellenistic kings did not use regnal numbers. Instead, they usually employed epithets to distinguish themselves from other rulers with similar names; the numbering of kings is mostly a modern practice. On his coins, AntiochusX appeared with the epithets Eusebes (the pious) and Philopator (father-loving). According to Appian, the king received the epithet Eusebes from the Syrians because he escaped a plot on his life by Seleucus VI, and, officially, the Syrians thought that he survived because of his piety, but, in reality, it was a prostitute in love with AntiochusX who saved him.

Beginning his reign in 218 SE (95/94 BC), AntiochusX was deprived of resources and lacked a queen. He therefore married a woman who could provide what he needed, his stepmother Cleopatra Selene. AntiochusX was probably no more than twenty years old while his wife was in her forties. This union was not unprecedented in the Seleucid dynasty, as Antiochus I had married his stepmother Stratonice, but nevertheless, the marriage was scandalous. Appian commented that he thought the real reason behind the epithet "Eusebes" to be a joke by the Syrians, mocking Antiochus X's piety, as he showed loyalty to his father by bedding his widow. Appian concluded that it was "divine vengeance" for his marriage that eventually led to Antiochus X's fall.

First reign in Antioch 

One of Antiochus X's first actions was to avenge his father; in 94 BC, he advanced on the capital Antioch and drove Seleucus VI out of northern Syria into Cilicia. According to Eusebius, the final battle between AntiochusX and Seleucus VI took place near the Cilician city of Mopsuestia, ending in Antiochus X's victory while Seleucus VI took refuge in the city, where he perished as a result of a popular revolt.

During the Seleucid period, currency struck in times of campaigns against a rival or a usurper showed the king bearded, and what seems to be the earliest bronze coinage of AntiochusX shows him with a curly beard, while later currency, apparently meant to show the king in firm control of his realm, depicted AntiochusX clean shaven. Early in 93 BC, the brothers of Seleucus VI, Antiochus XI and Philip I, avenged Seleucus VI by sacking Mopsuestia. Antiochus XI then advanced on Antioch, defeated Antiochus X, and expelled him from the city, reigning alone in the capital for few months.

Second reign in Antioch 

Antiochus X recruited new soldiers and attacked Antioch the same year. He emerged victorious, while Antiochus XI drowned in the Orontes River as he tried to flee. Now AntiochusX ruled northern Syria and Cilicia; around this time, Mopsuestia minted coins with the word "autonomous" inscribed. This new political status seems to have been a privilege bestowed upon the city by Antiochus X, who, as a sign of gratitude for Mopsuestia's role in eliminating Seleucus VI, apparently not just rebuilt it, but also compensated it for the damage it suffered at the hands of Seleucus VI's brothers. In the view of the numismatist , some coins minted in Mopsuestia may carry a portrait of Antiochus X. Other cities minted their own civic coinage under the king's rule, including Tripolis, Berytus, and perhaps the autonomous city of Ascalon.

In the capital, Antiochus X might have been responsible for building a library and an attached museum on the model of the Library of Alexandria. Philip I was probably centered at Beroea; his brother, Demetrius III, who ruled Damascus, supported him and marched north probably in the spring of 93 BC. AntiochusX faced fierce resistance from his cousins. In the year 220 SE (93/92BC), the city of Damascus stopped issuing coins in the name of Demetrius III, then resumed the following year; this could have been the result of incursions by Antiochus X, which weakened his cousin and made Damascus vulnerable to attacks by the Judaean king Alexander Jannaeus.

Children 
The Roman statesman Cicero wrote about two sons of AntiochusX and Cleopatra Selene who visited Rome during his time (between 75 and 73 BC); one of them was named Antiochus. The king might have also fathered a daughter with his wife; according to the first century historian Plutarch, the Armenian king Tigranes II, who killed Cleopatra Selene in 69 BC, "put to death the successors of Seleucus, and [carried] off their wives and daughters into captivity". This statement makes it possible to assume that AntiochusX had at least one daughter with his wife.
 Antiochus XIII: mentioned by Cicero. His epithets raised questions about how many sons with that name AntiochusX fathered; when Antiochus XIII issued coins as a sole ruler, he used the epithet Philadelphos ("brother-loving"), but on jugate coins that show Cleopatra Selene as regent along with a ruling son named Antiochus, the epithet Philometor ("mother-loving") is used. The historian , agreeing with the view of Bouché-Leclercq, argued that two sons, both named Antiochus, resulted from the marriage of AntiochusX and Cleopatra Selene. Cicero, on the other hand, left one of the brothers unnamed, and clearly stated that Antiochus was the name of only one prince. Ehling's theory is possible but only if "Antiochus Philometor" was the prince named by Cicero, and the brother, who had a different name, assumed the dynastic name Antiochus with the epithet Philadelphos when he became king following the death of Antiochus Philometor. In the view of the historian Adrian Dumitru, such a scenario is complicated; more likely, Antiochus XIII bore two epithets, Philadelphos and Philometor. Several numismatists, such as Oliver D. Hoover, Catharine Lorber and Arthur Houghton, agree that both epithets denoted Antiochus XIII.
 Seleucus VII: the numismatist Brian Kritt deciphered and published a newly discovered jugate coin bearing the portrait of Cleopatra Selene and a co-ruler in 2002. Kritt's reading gave the name of King Seleucus Philometor and, considering the epithet which means mother loving, equated him with the unnamed son mentioned by Cicero. Kritt gave the newly discovered king the regnal name Seleucus VII. Hoover proposed a different reading where the king's name is Antiochus, to be identified with Antiochus XIII.
 Seleucus Kybiosaktes: the unnamed son mentioned by Cicero does not appear in other ancient literature. Seleucus Kybiosaktes, a man who appeared  in Egypt as a husband of its queen Berenice IV, is identified by modern scholarship with the unnamed prince. According to the first century BC historian Strabo, Kybiosaktes pretended to be of Seleucid descent. Kritt considered it plausible to identify Seleucus VII with Seleucus Kybiosaktes.

Conflict with Parthia and demise 
Information about Antiochus X after the interference of Demetrius III is scanty. Ancient sources and modern scholars present different accounts and dates for the demise of the king. Antiochus X's end as told by Josephus, which has the king killed during a campaign against the Parthians, is considered the most reliable and likely by modern historians. Towards the end of his reign, Antiochus X increased his coin production, and this could be related to the campaign undertaken by the Seleucid monarch against Parthia, as recorded by Josephus. The Parthians were advancing in eastern Syria in the time of Antiochus X, which would have made it important for the king to counter attack, thus strengthening his position in the war against his cousins. The majority of scholars accept the year 92 BC for Antiochus X's end:

Year of death 

No known coins issued by the king in Antioch contain a date. Josephus wrote that the king fell soon after Demetrius III's interference, but this statement is vague. Most scholars, such as Edward Theodore Newell, understood Josephus's statement to indicate 92BC. According to Hoover, the dating of Newell is apparently based on combining the statement of Josephus with that of Eusebius, who wrote that AntiochusX was ejected from the capital in 220 SE (93/92 BC) by Philip I. Hoover considered Newell's dating hard to accept; a market weight from Antioch bearing Antiochus X's name, from 92 BC, might contradict the dating of 220 SE (93/92 BC). On the other hand, in the year 221 SE (92/91BC), the city of Antioch issued civic coinage mentioning no king; Hoover noted that the civic coinage mentions Antioch as the "metropolis" but not as autonomous, and this might be explained as a reward from AntiochusX bestowed upon the city for supporting him in his struggle against his cousins.

In 2007, using a methodology based on estimating the annual die usage average rate (the Esty formula), Hoover proposed the year 224 SE (89/88 BC) for the end of Antiochus X's reign. Later in 2011, Hoover noted that this date is hard to accept considering that during Antiochus X's second reign in the capital, only one or two dies were used per year, far too few for the Seleucid average rate to justify a long reign. Hoover then noted that there seem to be several indications that the coinage of Antiochus X's second reign in the capital, along with the coinages of Antiochus XI and Demetrius III, were re-coined by Philip I who eventually took Antioch , thus explaining the rarity of those kings' coins. Hoover admitted that his conclusion is "troubling". The historian  considered Hoover's dating and arguments too speculative, as they contradict ancient literature.

Manner of death 
The manner of the king's death varies depending on which ancient account is used. The main ancient historians providing information on Antiochus X's end are Josephus, Appian, Eusebius and Saint Jerome:

The account of Josephus: "For when he was come as an auxiliary to Laodice, queen of the Gileadites, when she was making war against the Parthians, and he was fighting courageously, he fell." The Parthians might have been allied with Philip I. The people of Laodice, their location, and who she was are hard to determine, as surviving manuscripts of Josephus's work transmit different names for the people. Gileadites is an older designation based on the Codex Leidensis (Lugdunensis) manuscript of Josephus's work, but the academic consensus uses the designation Sameans, based on the Codex Palatinus (Vaticanus) Graecus manuscript.
 Based on the reading Gileadites: In the view of Bouché-Leclercq, the division of Syria between AntiochusX and his cousins must have tempted the Parthian king Mithridates II to annex the kingdom. Bouché-Leclercq, agreeing with the historian Alfred von Gutschmid, identified the mysterious queen with Antiochus X's cousin Laodice, daughter of Antiochus VIII, and wife of Mithridates I, the king of Commagene, which had recently detached from the Seleucids, and suggested that Laodice resided in Samosata. Bouché-Leclercq hypothesized that AntiochusX did not go to help his rivals' sister, but to stop the Parthians before they reached his own borders. The historian Adolf Kuhn, on the other hand, considered it implausible that AntiochusX would support a daughter of Antiochus VIII and he questioned the identification with the queen of Commagene. Ehling, attempting to explain Antiochus X's assistance of Laodice, suggested that the queen was a daughter of Antiochus IX, a sister of Antiochus X.
 Based on the reading Sameans: the historian  considered Laodice a queen of a nomadic tribe based on the similarities between the name from the Codex Palatinus (Vaticanus) Graecus with the Samènes, a people mentioned by the sixth century geographer Stephanus of Byzantium as an Arab nomadic tribe. This would solve the problems posed by the identification with the queen of Commagene, and end the debate regarding the location of the people, as the nature of their nomadic life makes it impossible to determine exactly the place where the fight took place. Dobiáš attributed the initiative to AntiochusX who was not merely trying to defend his borders but actively attacking the Parthians.

The account of Appian: Antiochus X was expelled from Syria by Tigranes II of Armenia. Appian gave Tigranes II a reign of fourteen years in Syria ending in 69 BC. That year witnessed the retreat of the Armenian king due to a war with the Romans. Hence, the invasion of Syria by Tigranes, based on the account of Appian, probably took place in 83 BC. Bellinger dismissed this account, and considered that Appian confused AntiochusX with his son Antiochus XIII. Kuhn considered a confusion between father and son to be out of the question because Appian mentioned the epithet Eusebes when talking about the fate of Antiochus X. In the view of Kuhn, AntiochusX retreated to Cilicia after being defeated by Tigranes II, and his sons ruled that region after him and were reported visiting Rome in 73 BC. However, numismatic evidence proves that Demetrius III controlled Cilicia following the demise of Antiochus X, and that Tarsus minted coins in his name  SE (88/87 BC). The Egyptologist Christopher J. Bennett, considered it possible that AntiochusX retreated to Ptolemais after being defeated by Tigranes since it became his widow's base. In his history, Appian failed to mention the reigns of Demetrius III and Philip I in the capital which preceded the reign of Tigranes II. According to Hoover, Appian's ignorance of the intervening kings between AntiochusX and Tigranes II might explain how he confused Antiochus XIII, who is known to have fled from the Armenian king, with his father.

Eusebius and others: According to Eusebius, who used the account of the third century historian Porphyry, AntiochusX was ejected from the capital by Philip I in 220 SE (93/92 BC) and fled to the Parthians. Eusebius added that following the Roman conquest of Syria, AntiochusX surrendered to Pompey, hoping to be reinstated on the throne, but the people of Antioch paid money to the Roman general to avoid a Seleucid restoration. AntiochusX was then invited by the people of Alexandria to rule jointly with the daughters of Ptolemy XII, but he died of illness soon after. This account has been questioned by many scholars, such as Hoover and Bellinger. The story told by Eusebius contains factual inaccuracies, as he wrote that in the same year AntiochusX was defeated by Philip I, he surrendered to Pompey, while at the same time Philip I was captured by the governor of Syria Aulus Gabinius. However, Pompey arrived in Syria only in 64 BC, and left it in 62 BC. Aulus Gabinius was appointed governor of Syria in 57 BC. Also, the part of Eusebius's account regarding the surrender to Pompey echoes the fate of Antiochus XIII; the writer seems to be confusing the fate of AntiochusX with that of his son. The second century historian Justin, writing based on the work of the first century BC historian Trogus, also confused the father and son, as he wrote that AntiochusX was appointed king of Syria by the Roman general Lucullus following the defeat of Tigranes II in 69 BC.

Succession 

It is known from numismatic evidence that Demetrius III eventually succeeded AntiochusX in Antioch. Eusebius's statement that AntiochusX was ejected from the capital by Philip I in 220 SE (93/92 BC) is contradicted by the coins of Demetrius III, who was not mentioned at all by Eusebius. Any suggestions that Philip I controlled Antioch before the demise of Demetrius III can be dismissed; in addition to the numismatic evidence, no ancient source claimed that Demetrius III had to push Philip I out of the city.

In 1949, a jugate coin of Cleopatra Selene and Antiochus XIII, from the collection of the French archaeologist Henri Arnold Seyrig, was dated by the historian Alfred Bellinger to 92BC and ascribed to Antioch. Based on Bellinger's dating, some modern historians, such as Ehling, proposed that Cleopatra Selene enjoyed an ephemeral reign in Antioch between the death of her husband and the arrival of his successor. Bellinger doubted his own dating and the coin's place of issue in 1952, suggesting Cilicia instead of Antioch. This coin is dated by many twenty-first century scholars to 82BC.

See also 

 List of Syrian monarchs
 Timeline of Syrian history

Notes

References

Citations

Sources

External links 

 Antiochus X's recently discovered coin (after 2008) in "The Seleucid Coins Addenda System (SCADS)" website maintained by Oliver D. Hoover. Exhibiting what might be the king's first coin bearing a date, 221 SE (92/91 BC).
 Antiochus X's recently discovered coin (after 2008) in "The Seleucid Coins Addenda System (SCADS)" website maintained by Oliver D. Hoover. Exhibiting the king's first known coin minted in Tarsus.
 The coin (SNG Levante 1306) possibly depicting Antiochus X from Mopsuestia in "The Seleucid Coins Addenda System (SCADS)" website maintained by Oliver D. Hoover.
 The coin possibly dating to 221 SE (92/91 BC) exhibited in the blog of the numismatist Jayseth Guberman.

110s BC births
92 BC deaths
88 BC deaths
Year of birth uncertain
Year of death uncertain
1st-century BC Seleucid rulers
Antiochus 10
Antiochus 10
Antiochus 10
Monarchs killed in action